Revathi Advaithi is an Indian-born American business executive. She is the CEO of Flex (formerly Flextronics) and is an advocate for women in STEM and in the workplace. Prior to joining Flex in 2019, Advaithi worked in various leadership positions at Eaton and Honeywell.

Advaithi is a co-chair of the World Economic Forum (WEF) Advanced Manufacturing CEO Community (2022) and joined the WEF Alliance of CEO Climate Leaders (2021). She currently serves as an independent director for the Board of Directors of Uber  and Catalyst.org. She is also a member of the MIT Presidential CEO Advisory Board. She was named to Fortune’s Most Powerful Women list in 2019, 2020, 2021, and 2022.

Education 
Advaithi graduated with a bachelor’s degree in mechanical engineering from the Birla Institute of Technology and Science in 1990, and earned an MBA from the Thunderbird School of Global Management in 2005.

Career 
Advaithi began her career as a shop floor supervisor at Eaton in Shawnee, Oklahoma. She joined Honeywell in 2002, where she spent six years in functions spanning manufacturing and supply chain. In 2008, Advaithi returned to Eaton and helped run various groups within the electrical business unit for 10 years before becoming Eaton's COO.

In February 2019, Advaithi joined Flex as CEO. She has said her focus is on driving the next era of technology, manufacturing and supply chain.

She firmly believes that making advanced manufacturing ubiquitous requires public and private sector collaboration to prioritize innovation, inclusion, and sustainability.

Under Advaithi, Flex has shifted its focus to end-to-end customer value chain ownership, augmenting its core contract manufacturing business.

She cites her leadership style as “being empathetic but making decisions quickly.” When tasked with making difficult choices, she said she always starts with what is best for her colleagues. Advaithi's business philosophy also heavily focuses on sustainability, culture, diversity and inclusion, and doing the right thing. She frequently provides industry guidance for the manufacturing and supply chain sectors.

Advaithi has said the pandemic is “probably the most difficult time” she has faced in her career. Under her direction, Flex prepared its 50,000 Chinese workers to safely return to work in early February, and by early May, Flex had returned hundreds of remote workers to work and accelerated medical gear production to fight the pandemic. Supply chain, operations and government professionals have recognized Flex for its ability to “secure PPE for itself and also ensure that its suppliers across the value chain were well stocked.” 

Advaithi stated the disruption caused by the pandemic is prompting global businesses “to take a far more serious look at restructuring their supply chains.”. In 2022, she spoke about building more efficient supply chains at Fortune Brainstorm Tech.

As the CEO of one of the world's largest manufacturers, she frequently advises and consults with senior government stakeholders around the world on manufacturing, supply chain and trade issues.

Advaithi is also heavily focused on driving sustainable manufacturing practices at Flex. During her tenure, Flex made CDPs 'A list' for tackling water security and has pledged to cut company carbon emissions in half by 2030. In July 2022, under Advaithi's leadership, Flex announced a commitment to reach net zero greenhouse gas emissions by 2040.

Advaithi served on the board of BAE Systems between January 2019 - July 2020. In July 2020, she stepped down from this role and joined Uber as a board member. She is also a member of the Business Roundtable, and Catalyst CEO Champions For Change initiative.

Media and speaking 
In 2019, 2020, 2021 and 2022, Advaithi was named to Fortune's Most Powerful Women list, one of the few Indian-born CEOs recognized.

Business Today also recognized Advaithi as one of Most Powerful Women in India in 2020. In 2021, Gadgets Now listed Advaithi as one of the most important Indian-born tech executives in the world. Advaithi believes India offers “manufacturing capability for domestic consumption” and that “being able to manufacture for India in India is of huge importance to [Flex] customers.” 

In 2021, Advaithi became a member of World Economic Forum's Alliance of CEO Climate Leaders, a coalition of business leaders across key sectors committed to driving positive climate action and sustainable economic growth.

In 2022, Advaithi published three WEF articles, including “Here’s how automation and job creation can go hand in hand,” “Advanced manufacturing: 3 priorities for industry and government leaders,” and “Balancing the manufacturing ecosystem in a globalized world.”

In March 2022, the Milken Center for Advancing the American Dream featured Advaithi in the American Dream project, a video focused on how she is inspired by the strength of her mother, the importance of taking risks and not giving up through persistence.

In April 2022, the Wall Street Journal profiled Advaithi in “The Modeling of a Manufacturing CEO” a Personal Board of Directors article focused on how she rose to the top of her industry with the encouragement from influential advisors.

3BL also recognized her as a 2021 Responsible CEO of the Year for Worldwide Impact for her proven leadership on environmental, social and governance commitments.

The National Safety Council (NSC) also named her as a “CEO Who Gets It” (2022) for fostering a culture where safety is a top priority.

Advaithi is also a frequent public speaker. She has spoken at the Fortune's Global Forum  and Most Powerful Women conferences, the Collision Conference, Ethisphere's Global Ethics Summit, Silicon Valley Leadership Group Annual Forum, WEF's Advanced Manufacturing Working Group, Harvard Business School panels, Women Executive 50 Summit and Catalyst conferences  and Carnegie Mellon University events.

Under Advaithi, Flex was named one of the World's Most Admired Companies  and recognized on the Global 500 by Fortune.

Personal life 
Advaithi was born in India in 1967 to A.N.N Swamy, a chemical engineer and Visalam Swamy, a homemaker. Advaithi has four sisters. Her family lived in Bihar, Gujarat, Assam before finally settling in Chennai, India.

Advaithi met her husband Jeevan Mulgund in Hutchinson, KS and they married in 1998. Mulgund and Advaithi have since lived in England, Shanghai, Phoenix, AZ, Pittsburgh, PA, and they are currently residing in the San Francisco Bay Area. They have two children.

Advaithi is a passionate advocate for diversity and inclusion in the workforce, as well as STEM education for girls  and computer science education.

References 

Living people
American people of Indian descent
Birla Institute of Technology and Science, Pilani alumni
Thunderbird School of Global Management alumni
American women chief executives
1967 births
21st-century American women
Indian emigrants to the United States
Directors of Uber